Cerfbeer, Cerf Beer or Cerfberr is a French-language Jewish surname derived from the names Cerf and Beer. Notable people with this surname include the following:
 Herz Cerfbeer of Medelsheim (or Cerf Beer), otherwise Naphtali Ben Dov-Beer (1730–1793), Alsatian-French Jewish philanthropist
 Samson Cerfberr of Medelsheim ( – 1826), Alsatian-French Jewish soldier and author
 Frédéric Cerfberr (1786–1842), Alsatian-French Jewish diplomat
 Max-Théodore Cerfbeer (1792–1876), French Jewish military officer
 Maximilien Charles Alphonse Cerfberr of Medelsheim (1817–1883), French Jewish journalist, writer
 Auguste Édouard Cerfberr (1811–1858), French Jewish author
 Anatole Cerfberr (1835–1896), French Jewish journalist and author

French-language surnames
Jewish surnames